Caubiac is a commune in the Haute-Garonne department in southwestern France. The ancient Gallo-Roman Caubiac Treasure was supposedly found in the village. It is now part of the British Museum's collection but was found in the nearby village of Thil.

Population

See also
Communes of the Haute-Garonne department

References

Communes of Haute-Garonne